The Tung Po Tor Monastery is situated at the foot of Tin Fat Shan in Lo Wai, Tsuen Wan, Hong Kong. Parts of the monastery are listed as Grade II historic buildings.

History
The Tung Po Tor Monastery was founded in 1932 by the Buddhist Mau Fung for the worship of the Kwun Yum (Goddess of Mercy) including a main hall called Yuen Tung Po Din and an entrance hall called Tin Wong Din separated by an open courtyard in between. There is a big bronze tripod in front of its main hall and the place on which the tripod stands was made in a blast during the Sino-Japanese War. The articles used by Mau Fung and the yellow sateen, the Five Garments and the Bag given by the Emperor of Japan are in display in the Memorial Hall. The temple also displays a statue of a Buddhist medical practitioner that is cast in ancient bronze in the Ming Dynasty.

Architecture
The Tin Wong Din (or Wai Tor Din ) is a building in front of the Yuen Tung Bo Din building. It is also a two-storey building constructed of concrete and stone with its walls and columns to support its pitched roofs of timber rafters, purlins and clay tiles. Four round columns painted red are arranged in 1:2:1 proportion in the interiors of the building. The external walls are plastered and painted in earth yellow colour. An altar in the middle of the ground floor hall houses a statue of Maitreya facing the entrance and a statue of Wai Tor (Skanda) facing the garden. At the two side platforms are the four standing huge statues of the Four Heavenly Kings. The upper floor is a classroom and library for the young monks to study while the ridge of the building is decorated with a pearl and two aoyus.

Conservation
Yuen Tong Po Din, as well as Tin Wong Din and Wai Tor Din, were declared as Grade II historic buildings in April 2010.

References

External links

 Antiquities Advisory Board. Historic Building Appraisal. Tung Po Tor Monastery, Yuen Tung Po Din Pictures
 Antiquities Advisory Board. Historic Building Appraisal. Tung Po Tor Monastery, Tin Wong Din & Wai Tor Din Pictures

Buddhist monasteries in Hong Kong
Buddhist temples in Hong Kong
Grade II historic buildings in Hong Kong
Tsuen Wan District